Braniff is both a given name and surname. Notable people with the name include:

Braniff Bonaventure (born 1973), American football player
Alberto Braniff (1884–1966), Mexican airplane pilot
Kevin Braniff (born 1983), Northern Irish footballer
Paul Braniff (hurler) (born 1983), Irish hurler
Paul Revere Braniff (1897–1954), American airline executive
Thomas Elmer Braniff (1883–1954), American airline executive

See also
 Paul Braniff (disambiguation)
 Braniff (disambiguation)